List of compositions by Django Reinhardt, the Belgian-born Romani-French jazz guitarist and composer. He was the first major jazz talent to emerge from Europe and remains the most significant.

A-H
 Anouman
 Appel Indirect
 Are you in the Mood (with Stéphane Grappelli)
 Artillerie Lourde
 Babik
 Belleville
 Black and White (with Stéphane Grappelli)
 Black Night
 Diminishing
 Diminishing Blackness
 Blues
 Blues Clair
 Blues d’Autrefois
 Blues en Mineur
 Blues for Barclay
 Blues for Ike
 Blues Riff
 Boléro
 Boogie Woogie
 Bricktop (with Stéphane Grappelli)
 Cavalerie (with Stéphane Grappelli)
 Chez Jacquet (never recorded by Django)
 Choti (never recorded by Django)
 Christmas Swing
 Crépuscule
 D.R.Blues
 Daphné
 Del Salle
 Deccaphonie
 Dinette
 Djalamichto (never recorded by Django)
 Djangology (with Stéphane Grappelli)
 Django Rag
 Django’s Blues
 Django’s Tiger (with Stéphane Grappelli)
 Double Whisky
 Douce Ambiance
 Duke and Dukie
" Echoes of Spain
 En Verdine (Never recorded by Django)
 Fantaisie (from Danse Norvegienne by Grieg)
 Fat
 Féerie
 Festival 48
 Fiddle Blues
 Fleche d’Or
 Fleur d’Ennui
 Folie à Amphion
 Gagoug (never recorded by Django)
 Gaiement
 Gin Gin
 Gypsy with a Song Pt1 & Pt2
 HCQ Strut (with Stéphane Grappelli)
 Hungaria (melody may be from a traditional pop song)

I-P
 Impromptu
 Improvisation #1
 Improvisation #2
 Improvisation #3
 Improvisation #4
 Improvisation #5
 Improvisation #6
 Incidental Music for Racine's Andromaque
 Just For Fun
 Lentement Madamoiselle (March, 1942)
 Mabel
 Mano
 Manoir de mes rêves
 Django's Castle
 Castle of My Dreams
 Mélodie au crépuscule (Always credited to Django Reinhardt but written by Joseph Reinhardt - as per Michael Dregni/Francis-Alfred Moerman/Matelo Ferret)
 Love's melody
 Messe des Saintes-Maries-de-la-Mer (never recorded by Django)
 Micro
 Mike
 Swing Dynamique
 Minor Blues
 Minor Swing (with Stéphane Grappelli)
 Moppin' The Bride (with Stéphane Grappelli)
 Danse nuptiale
 No Name Blues
 Montagne Sainte-Genevieve (never recorded by Django)
 My Serenade
 Mystery Pacific
 Naguine
 Nocturne (with Stéphane Grappelli)
 Nuages
 Nuits de Saint-Germain-des-Prés
 Nymphéas
 Oiseaux des iles
 Oriental Shuffle (with Stéphane Grappelli)
 Oubli
 Paramount Stomp
 Parfum
 Pêche à la Mouche
 Place de Brouckère
 Porto Cabello
 Pour que Ma Vie Demeure

Q-Z
 R. vingt-six (the last of those pieces co-authored by Stéphane Grappelli)
 Rhythme Futur
 Souvenirs (with Stéphane Grappelli)
 Spivy (with Stéphane Grappelli)
 Speevy
 Stephen's Blues
 Stockholm
 Stompin’ at Decca (with Stéphane Grappelli)
 Sweet Chorus
 Swing 39 (with Stéphane Grappelli)
 Swing 41
 Swing 42
 Swing 48
 Swing de Paris (with Stéphane Grappelli)
 Swing From Paris
 Swing Guitars (with Stéphane Grappelli)
 Swinging With Django
 Swingtime in Springtime
 Tears (with Stéphane Grappelli)  - Based on a Gypsy lullaby “Muri wachsella an u sennelo weesch” recorded on April 3, 1937. Dregni (2008) p. 64.
 Testament (never recorded by Django)
 This Kind of Friend
 Troublant Boléro
 Twelfth Year
 Two Improvised Guitar Choruses
 Ultrafox (with Stéphane Grappelli) (April, 1935)
 Vamp
 Vendredi 13
 Vette
 Webster

Waltzes
Django’s waltzes: Montagne Sainte-Genevieve, Gagoug, Chez Jazquet, and Choti were recorded by Pierre (Jean) "Matelo" Ferret in Paris, 1960. Djalamichto and En verdine were recorded by Ferret in 1961.

Matelo Ferret (g) acc by (b) and (d) - Paris, 1960 - Vogue (F)EPL7740
Chez Jacquet, Montagne Sainte Genevieve, Gagoug, Choti

Matelo Ferret Plays Unissued Django Numbers : Jean "Matlo" Ferret (g) solo acc by unknown other (g's), (b) and (d) - Paris, 1961 - Vogue (F)EPL7829
En verdine, Djalmichito

NOTE: Chpile t'chavo and Tchoucar wago were composed by Matelo Ferret.

There exists a brief recording of Django's "Messe" played on the Organ.

Music for Racine's Andromaque

Antonietto, Alain, François Billiard, and François Billiard. Django Reinhardt : Rythmes Futurs. Paris: Fayard, 2004. Pages 344-345

Quite unaware of the dangers he faced as a Gypsy, during the German occupation, Django agreed to compose incidental music for a "modern" version of Andromaque by Racine, which promised to be dangerously scandalous . Directed by Jean Marais, and with avant-garde staging and scenery, the play, opened in May 1944 at the Theatre Edouard VII. 

Those involved in the production were provoked with physical threats by the Militia, and the vengeance of the collaborationist press. André Castelot in the publication, La Gerbe - June 1, 1944 - even attacked the music of Django ... advising him to "go green" (camouflage) while traveling around France - whether with his quintet, or when in the company of his memorable nomadic "cousins". 

Django went to the Riviera, especially Toulon, where in August 1944, he joined an orchestra of American G.I.s which had just arrived.

___

Ideology, Cultural Politics and Literary Collaboration at la Gerbe by Richard J. Golsan

Of the major weekly reviews published in Paris during the Occupation, perhaps none is more representative of the period itself and the spirit of collaboration with Nazi Germany than La Gerbe. Created 'out of whole cloth' by the German Embassy to serve its political and cultural objectives,[2] la Gerbe began publication in July 1940 and ceased publication in August 1944. 

Two hundred and fourteen issues of the journal appeared in all. A large-scale poster campaign in the streets of Paris preceded the appearance of the first number of La Gerbe on 11 July 1940,[3] and the offices of the journal on the Rue des Pyramides were ransacked following the Liberation.

Reinhardt, Django